Love Dies Young is a song by American rock band Foo Fighters. It was released as the fifth and final single from their tenth studio album, Medicine at Midnight, on November 22, 2021. It was the final Foo Fighters single to feature drummer and songwriter Taylor Hawkins, who died on March 25, 2022.

Music video
Directed by Dave Grohl, the music video depicts the band as synchronized swimmers with their faces deepfaked onto each swimmer. Their coach played by Jason Sudeikis begins with a 4 minute speech berating them before going out to perform for a group of judges in a competition. The end of the video pays homage to the Babe Ruth incident from the film Caddyshack where the group finishes their routine with a perfect score until one member defecates in the pool causing all the judges to start throwing up and the coach runs out of the pool area with a frightened expression. Pat Smear, who is shown in a hazmat suit cleaning the contaminated pool, finds the feces on the floor and eats it.

Charts

Weekly charts

Year-end charts

References

2020 songs
Foo Fighters songs
Songs written by Dave Grohl
Songs written by Taylor Hawkins
Songs written by Nate Mendel
Songs written by Chris Shiflett
Songs written by Pat Smear
Song recordings produced by Greg Kurstin
Songs written by Rami Jaffee